In nutrition, biology, and chemistry, fat usually means any ester of fatty acids, or a mixture of such compounds, most commonly those that occur in living beings or in food.

The term often refers specifically to triglycerides (triple esters of glycerol), that are the main components of vegetable oils and of fatty tissue in animals; or, even more narrowly, to triglycerides that are solid or semisolid at room temperature, thus excluding oils.  The term may also be used more broadly as a synonym of lipid—any substance of biological relevance, composed of carbon, hydrogen, or oxygen, that is insoluble in water but soluble in non-polar solvents.  In this sense, besides the triglycerides, the term would include several other types of compounds like mono- and diglycerides, phospholipids (such as lecithin), sterols (such as cholesterol), waxes (such as beeswax), and free fatty acids, which are usually present in human diet in smaller amounts.

Fats are one of the three main macronutrient groups in human diet, along with carbohydrates and proteins, and the main components of common food products like milk, butter, tallow, lard, salt pork, and cooking oils. They are a major and dense source of food energy for many animals and play important structural and metabolic functions, in most living beings, including energy storage, waterproofing, and thermal insulation. The human body can produce the fat it requires from other food ingredients, except for a few essential fatty acids that must be included in the diet. Dietary fats are also the carriers of some flavor and aroma ingredients and vitamins that are not water-soluble.

Biological importance 
In humans and many animals, fats serve both as energy sources and as stores for energy in excess of what the body needs immediately. Each gram of fat when burned or metabolized releases about 9 food calories (37 kJ = 8.8 kcal).

Fats are also sources of essential fatty acids, an important dietary requirement. Vitamins A, D, E, and K are fat-soluble, meaning they can only be digested, absorbed, and transported in conjunction with fats.

Fats play a vital role in maintaining healthy skin and hair, insulating body organs against shock, maintaining body temperature, and promoting healthy cell function. Fat also serves as a useful buffer against a host of diseases. When a particular substance, whether chemical or biotic, reaches unsafe levels in the bloodstream, the body can effectively dilute—or at least maintain equilibrium of—the offending substances by storing it in new fat tissue. This helps to protect vital organs, until such time as the offending substances can be metabolized or removed from the body by such means as excretion, urination, accidental or intentional bloodletting, sebum excretion, and hair growth.

Adipose tissue

In animals, adipose tissue, or fatty tissue is the body's means of storing metabolic energy over extended periods of time. Adipocytes (fat cells) store fat derived from the diet and from liver metabolism. Under energy stress these cells may degrade their stored fat to supply fatty acids and also glycerol to the circulation. These metabolic activities are regulated by several hormones (e.g., insulin, glucagon and epinephrine). Adipose tissue also secretes the hormone leptin.

Production and processing
A variety of chemical and physical techniques are used for the production and processing of fats, both industrially and in cottage or home settings. They include:
 Pressing to extract liquid fats from fruits, seeds, or algae, e.g. olive oil from olives
 Solvent extraction using solvents like hexane or supercritical carbon dioxide
 Rendering, the melting of fat in adipose tissue, e.g. to produce tallow, lard, fish oil, and whale oil
 Churning of milk to produce butter
 Hydrogenation to increase the degree of saturation of the fatty acids
 Interesterification, the rearrangement of fatty acids across different triglycerides
 Winterization to remove oil components with higher melting points
 Clarification of butter

Metabolism 

The pancreatic lipase acts at the ester bond, hydrolyzing the bond and "releasing" the fatty acid. In triglyceride form, lipids cannot be absorbed by the duodenum. Fatty acids, monoglycerides (one glycerol, one fatty acid), and some diglycerides are absorbed by the duodenum, once the triglycerides have been broken down.

In the intestine, following the secretion of lipases and bile, triglycerides are split into monoacylglycerol and free fatty acids in a process called lipolysis. They are subsequently moved to absorptive enterocyte cells lining the intestines. The triglycerides are rebuilt in the enterocytes from their fragments and packaged together with cholesterol and proteins to form chylomicrons. These are excreted from the cells and collected by the lymph system and transported to the large vessels near the heart before being mixed into the blood. Various tissues can capture the chylomicrons, releasing the triglycerides to be used as a source of energy. Liver cells can synthesize and store triglycerides. When the body requires fatty acids as an energy source, the hormone glucagon signals the breakdown of the triglycerides by hormone-sensitive lipase to release free fatty acids. As the brain cannot utilize fatty acids as an energy source (unless converted to a ketone), the glycerol component of triglycerides can be converted into glucose, via gluconeogenesis by conversion into dihydroxyacetone phosphate and then into glyceraldehyde 3-phosphate, for brain fuel when it is broken down. Fat cells may also be broken down for that reason if the brain's needs ever outweigh the body's.

Triglycerides cannot pass through cell membranes freely. Special enzymes on the walls of blood vessels called lipoprotein lipases must break down triglycerides into free fatty acids and glycerol. Fatty acids can then be taken up by cells via the fatty acid transporter (FAT).

Triglycerides, as major components of very-low-density lipoprotein (VLDL) and chylomicrons, play an important role in metabolism as energy sources and transporters of dietary fat. They contain more than twice as much energy (approximately 9kcal/g or 38kJ/g) as carbohydrates (approximately 4kcal/g or 17kJ/g).

Nutritional and health aspects
The most common type of fat, in human diet and most living beings, is a triglyceride, an ester of the triple alcohol glycerol  and three fatty acids.  The molecule of a triglyceride can be described as resulting from a condensation reaction (specifically, esterification) between each of glycerol's –OH groups and the HO– part of the carboxyl group  of each fatty acid, forming an ester bridge  with elimination of a water molecule .

Other less common types of fats include diglycerides and monoglycerides, where the esterification is limited to two or just one of glycerol's –OH groups. Other alcohols, such as cetyl alcohol (predominant in spermaceti), may replace glycerol. In the phospholipids, one of the fatty acids is replaced by phosphoric acid or a monoester thereof.
The benefits and risks of various amounts and types of dietary fats have been the object of much study, and are still highly controversial topics.

Essential fatty acids
There are two essential fatty acids (EFAs) in human nutrition: alpha-Linolenic acid (an omega-3 fatty acid) and linoleic acid (an omega-6 fatty acid). The adult body can synthesize other lipids that it needs from these two.

Dietary sources

Saturated vs. unsaturated fats

Different foods contain different amounts of fat with different proportions of saturated and unsaturated fatty acids. Some animal products, like beef and dairy products made with whole or reduced fat milk like yogurt, ice cream, cheese and butter have mostly saturated fatty acids (and some have significant contents of dietary cholesterol). Other animal products, like pork, poultry, eggs, and seafood have mostly unsaturated fats. Industrialized baked goods may use fats with high unsaturated fat contents as well, especially those containing partially hydrogenated oils, and processed foods that are deep-fried in hydrogenated oil are high in saturated fat content.

Plants and fish oil generally contain a higher proportion of unsaturated acids, although there are exceptions such as coconut oil and palm kernel oil. Foods containing unsaturated fats include avocado, nuts, olive oils, and vegetable oils such as canola.

Many careful studies have found that replacing saturated fats with cis unsaturated fats in the diet reduces risk of cardiovascular diseases (CVDs), diabetes, or death. These studies prompted many medical organizations and public health departments, including the World Health Organization (WHO), to officially issue that advice. Some countries with such recommendations include:

 United Kingdom
 United States
 India
 Canada
 Australia
 Singapore
 New Zealand
 Hong Kong

A 2004 review concluded that "no lower safe limit of specific saturated fatty acid intakes has been identified" and recommended that the influence of varying saturated fatty acid intakes against a background of different individual lifestyles and genetic backgrounds should be the focus in future studies.

This advice is often oversimplified by labeling the two kinds of fats as bad fats and good fats, respectively. However, since the fats and oils in most natural and traditionally processed foods contain both unsaturated and saturated fatty acids, the complete exclusion of saturated fat is unrealistic and possibly unwise. For instance, some foods rich in saturated fat, such as coconut and palm oil, are an important source of cheap dietary calories for a large fraction of the population in developing countries.

Concerns were also expressed at a 2010 conference of the American Dietetic Association that a blanket recommendation to avoid saturated fats could drive people to also reduce the amount of polyunsaturated fats,  which may have health benefits, and/or replace fats by refined carbohydrates — which carry a high risk of obesity and heart disease.

For these reasons, the U.S. Food and Drug Administration, for example, recommends to consume at least 10% (7% for high-risk groups) of calories from saturated fat, with an average of 30% (or less) of total calories from all fat. A general 7% limit was recommended also by the American Heart Association (AHA) in 2006.

The WHO/FAO report also recommended replacing fats so as to reduce the content of myristic and palmitic acids, specifically.

The so-called Mediterranean diet, prevalent in many countries in the Mediterranean Sea area, includes more total fat than the diet of Northern European countries, but most of it is in the form of unsaturated fatty acids (specifically, monounsaturated and omega-3) from olive oil and fish, vegetables, and certain meats like lamb, while consumption of saturated fat is minimal in comparison.
A 2017 review found evidence that a Mediterranean-style diet could reduce the risk of cardiovascular diseases, overall cancer incidence, neurodegenerative diseases, diabetes, and mortality rate. A 2018 review showed that a Mediterranean-like diet may improve overall health status, such as reduced risk of non-communicable diseases. It also may reduce the social and economic costs of diet-related illnesses.

A small number of contemporary reviews have challenged this negative view of saturated fats. For example, an evaluation of evidence from 1966 to 1973 of the observed health impact of replacing dietary saturated fat with linoleic acid found that it increased rates of death from all causes, coronary heart disease, and cardiovascular disease.  These studies have been disputed by many scientists, and the consensus in the medical community is that saturated fat and cardiovascular disease are closely related. Still, these discordant studies fueled debate over the merits of substituting polyunsaturated fats for saturated fats.

Cardiovascular disease

The effect of saturated fat on cardiovascular disease has been extensively studied. The general consensus is that there is evidence of moderate-quality of a strong, consistent, and graded relationship between saturated fat intake, blood cholesterol levels, and the incidence of cardiovascular disease. The relationships are accepted as causal, including by many government and medical organizations.

A 2017 review by the AHA estimated that replacement of saturated fat with polyunsaturated fat in the American diet could reduce the risk of cardiovascular diseases by 30%.

The consumption of saturated fat is generally considered a risk factor for dyslipidemia—abnormal blood lipid levels, including high total cholesterol, high levels of triglycerides, high levels of low-density lipoprotein (LDL, "bad" cholesterol) or low levels of high-density lipoprotein (HDL, "good" cholesterol).  These parameters in turn are believed to be risk indicators for some types of cardiovascular disease. These effects were observed in children too.

Several meta-analyses (reviews and consolidations of multiple previously published experimental studies) have confirmed a significant relationship between saturated fat and high serum cholesterol levels, which in turn have been claimed to have a causal relation with increased risk of cardiovascular disease (the so-called lipid hypothesis).  However, high cholesterol may be caused by many factors.  Other indicators, such as high LDL/HDL ratio, have proved to be more predictive.  In a study of myocardial infarction in 52 countries, the ApoB/ApoA1 (related to LDL and HDL, respectively) ratio was the strongest predictor of CVD among all risk factors.  There are other pathways involving obesity, triglyceride levels, insulin sensitivity, endothelial function, and thrombogenicity, among others, that play a role in CVD, although it seems, in the absence of an adverse blood lipid profile, the other known risk factors have only a weak atherogenic effect.  Different saturated fatty acids have differing effects on various lipid levels.

Cancer
The evidence for a relation between saturated fat intake and cancer is significantly weaker, and there does not seem to be a clear medical consensus about it.

 A meta-analysis published in 2003 found a significant positive relationship between saturated fat and breast cancer.  However two subsequent reviews have found weak or insignificant relation, and noted the prevalence of confounding factors.
 Another review found limited evidence for a positive relationship between consuming animal fat and incidence of colorectal cancer.
 Other meta-analyses found evidence for increased risk of ovarian cancer by high consumption of saturated fat.
 Some studies have indicated that serum myristic acid and palmitic acid  and dietary myristic and palmitic saturated fatty acids and serum palmitic combined with alpha-tocopherol supplementation are associated with increased risk of prostate cancer in a dose-dependent manner. These associations may, however, reflect differences in intake or metabolism of these fatty acids between the precancer cases and controls, rather than being an actual cause.

Bones
Various animal studies have indicated that the intake of saturated fat has a negative effect on effects on the mineral density of bones. One study suggested that men may be particularly vulnerable.

Disposition and overall health

Studies have shown that substituting monounsaturated fatty acids for saturated ones is associated with increased daily physical activity and resting energy expenditure. More physical activity, less anger, and less irritability were associated with a higher-oleic acid diet than one of a palmitic acid diet.

Monounsaturated vs. polyunsaturated fat

The most common fatty acids in human diet are unsaturated or mono-unsaturated.  Monounsaturated fats are found in animal flesh such as red meat, whole milk products, nuts, and high fat fruits such as olives and avocados. Olive oil is about 75% monounsaturated fat. The high oleic variety sunflower oil contains at least 70% monounsaturated fat. Canola oil and cashews are both about 58% monounsaturated fat. Tallow (beef fat) is about 50% monounsaturated fat. and lard is about 40% monounsaturated fat. Other sources include hazelnut, avocado oil, macadamia nut oil, grapeseed oil, groundnut oil (peanut oil), sesame oil, corn oil, popcorn, whole grain wheat, cereal, oatmeal, almond oil, sunflower oil, hemp oil, and tea-oil camellia.

Polyunsaturated fatty acids can be found mostly in nuts, seeds, fish, seed oils, and oysters.

Food sources of polyunsaturated fats include:

Insulin resistance and sensitivity 

MUFAs (especially oleic acid) have been found to lower the incidence of insulin resistance; PUFAs (especially large amounts of arachidonic acid) and SFAs (such as arachidic acid) increased it. These ratios can be indexed in the phospholipids of human skeletal muscle and in other tissues as well.  This relationship between dietary fats and insulin resistance is presumed secondary to the relationship between insulin resistance and inflammation, which is partially modulated by dietary fat ratios (Omega-3/6/9) with both omega 3 and 9 thought to be anti-inflammatory, and omega 6 pro-inflammatory (as well as by numerous other dietary components, particularly polyphenols and exercise, with both of these anti-inflammatory). Although both pro- and anti-inflammatory types of fat are biologically necessary, fat dietary ratios in most US diets are skewed towards Omega 6, with subsequent disinhibition of inflammation and potentiation of insulin resistance. This is contrary to the suggestion that polyunsaturated fats are shown to be protective against insulin resistance.

The large scale KANWU study found that increasing MUFA and decreasing SFA intake could improve insulin sensitivity, but only when the overall fat intake of the diet was low. However, some MUFAs may promote insulin resistance (like the SFAs), whereas PUFAs may protect against it.

Cancer
Levels of oleic acid along with other MUFAs in red blood cell membranes were positively associated with breast cancer risk. The saturation index (SI) of the same membranes was inversely associated with breast cancer risk. MUFAs and low SI in erythrocyte membranes are predictors of postmenopausal breast cancer. Both of these variables depend on the activity of the enzyme delta-9 desaturase (Δ9-d).

Results from observational clinical trials on PUFA intake and cancer have been inconsistent and vary by numerous factors of cancer incidence, including gender and genetic risk. Some studies have shown associations between higher intakes and/or blood levels of omega-3 PUFAs and a decreased risk of certain cancers, including breast and colorectal cancer, while other studies found no associations with cancer risk.

Pregnancy disorders
Polyunsaturated fat supplementation was found to have no effect on the incidence of pregnancy-related disorders, such as hypertension or preeclampsia, but may increase the length of gestation slightly and decreased the incidence of early premature births.

Expert panels in the United States and Europe recommend that pregnant and lactating women consume higher amounts of polyunsaturated fats than the general population to enhance the DHA status of the fetus and newborn.

"Cis fat" vs. "trans fat"

In nature, unsaturated fatty acids generally have double bonds in cis configuration (with the adjacent C–C bonds on the same side) as opposed to trans.  Nevertheless, trans fatty acids (TFAs) occur in small amounts in meat and milk of ruminants (such as cattle and sheep), typically 2–5% of total fat. Natural TFAs, which include conjugated linoleic acid (CLA) and vaccenic acid, originate in the rumen of these animals. CLA has two double bonds, one in the cis configuration and one in trans, which makes it simultaneously a cis- and a trans-fatty acid.

Concerns about trans fatty acids in human diet were raised when they were found to be an unintentional byproduct of the partial hydrogenation of vegetable and fish oils. While these trans fatty acids (popularly called "trans fats") are edible, they have been implicated in many health problems.

The hydrogenation process, invented and patented by Wilhelm Normann in 1902, made it possible to turn relatively cheap liquid fats such as whale or fish oil into more solid fats and to extend their shelf-life by preventing rancidification.  (The source fat and the process were initially kept secret to avoid consumer distaste.) This process was widely adopted by the food industry in the early 1900s; first for the production of margarine, a replacement for butter and shortening, and eventually for various other fats used in snack food, packaged baked goods, and deep fried products.

Full hydrogenation of a fat or oil produces a fully saturated fat. However, hydrogenation generally was interrupted before completion, to yield a fat product with specific melting point, hardness, and other properties. Partial hydrogenation turns some of the cis double bonds into trans bonds by an isomerization reaction. The trans configuration is favored  because it is the lower energy form.

This side reaction accounts for most of the trans fatty acids consumed today, by far. An analysis of some industrialized foods in 2006 found up to 30% "trans fats" in artificial shortening, 10% in breads and cake products, 8% in cookies and crackers, 4% in salty snacks, 7% in cake frostings and sweets, and 26% in margarine and other processed spreads.  Another 2010 analysis however found only 0.2% of trans fats in margarine and other processed spreads.   Up to 45% of the total fat in those foods containing man-made trans fats formed by partially hydrogenating plant fats may be trans fat. Baking shortenings, unless reformulated, contain around 30% trans fats compared to their total fats. High-fat dairy products such as butter contain about 4%. Margarines not reformulated to reduce trans fats may contain up to 15% trans fat by weight, but some reformulated ones are less than 1% trans fat.

High levels of TFAs have been recorded in popular "fast food" meals. An analysis of samples of McDonald's French fries collected in 2004 and 2005 found that fries served in New York City contained twice as much trans fat as in Hungary, and 28 times as much as in Denmark, where trans fats are restricted.  For Kentucky Fried Chicken products, the pattern was reversed: the Hungarian product containing twice the trans fat of the New York product. Even within the United States, there was variation, with fries in New York containing 30% more trans fat than those from Atlanta.

Cardiovascular disease
Numerous studies have found that consumption of TFAs increases risk of cardiovascular disease.  The Harvard School of Public Health advises that replacing TFAs and saturated fats with cis monounsaturated and polyunsaturated fats is beneficial for health.

Consuming trans fats has been shown to increase the risk of coronary artery disease in part by raising levels of low-density lipoprotein (LDL, often termed "bad cholesterol"), lowering levels of high-density lipoprotein (HDL, often termed "good cholesterol"), increasing triglycerides in the bloodstream and promoting systemic inflammation.

The primary health risk identified for trans fat consumption is an elevated risk of coronary artery disease (CAD). A 1994 study estimated that over 30,000 cardiac deaths per year in the United States are attributable to the consumption of trans fats. By 2006 upper estimates of 100,000 deaths were suggested. A comprehensive review of studies of trans fats published in 2006 in the New England Journal of Medicine reports a strong and reliable connection between trans fat consumption and CAD, concluding that "On a per-calorie basis, trans fats appear to increase the risk of CAD more than any other macronutrient, conferring a substantially increased risk at low levels of consumption (1 to 3% of total energy intake)".

The major evidence for the effect of trans fat on CAD comes from the Nurses' Health Study – a cohort study that has been following 120,000 female nurses since its inception in 1976. In this study, Hu and colleagues analyzed data from 900 coronary events from the study's population during 14 years of followup. He determined that a nurse's CAD risk roughly doubled (relative risk of 1.93, CI: 1.43 to 2.61) for each 2% increase in trans fat calories consumed (instead of carbohydrate calories). By contrast, for each 5% increase in saturated fat calories (instead of carbohydrate calories) there was a 17% increase in risk (relative risk of 1.17, CI: 0.97 to 1.41). "The replacement of saturated fat or trans unsaturated fat by cis (unhydrogenated) unsaturated fats was associated with larger reductions in risk than an isocaloric replacement by carbohydrates." Hu also reports on the benefits of reducing trans fat consumption. Replacing 2% of food energy from trans fat with non-trans unsaturated fats more than halves the risk of CAD (53%). By comparison, replacing a larger 5% of food energy from saturated fat with non-trans unsaturated fats reduces the risk of CAD by 43%.

Another study considered deaths due to CAD, with consumption of trans fats being linked to an increase in mortality, and consumption of polyunsaturated fats being linked to a decrease in mortality.

Trans fat has been found to act like saturated in raising the blood level of LDL ("bad cholesterol"); but, unlike saturated fat, it also decreases levels of HDL ("good cholesterol"). The net increase in LDL/HDL ratio with trans fat, a widely accepted indicator of risk for coronary artery disease, is approximately double that due to saturated fat. One randomized crossover study published in 2003 comparing the effect of eating a meal on blood lipids of (relatively) cis and trans-fat-rich meals showed that cholesteryl ester transfer (CET) was 28% higher after the trans meal than after the cis meal and that lipoprotein concentrations were enriched in apolipoprotein(a) after the trans meals.

The citokyne test is a potentially more reliable indicator of CAD risk, although is still being studied. A study of over 700 nurses showed that those in the highest quartile of trans fat consumption had blood levels of C-reactive protein (CRP) that were 73% higher than those in the lowest quartile.

Breast feeding

It has been established that trans fats in human breast milk fluctuate with maternal consumption of trans fat, and that the amount of trans fats in the bloodstream of breastfed infants fluctuates with the amounts found in their milk. In 1999, reported percentages of trans fats (compared to total fats) in human milk ranged from 1% in Spain, 2% in France, 4% in Germany, and 7% in Canada and the United States.

Other health risks
There are suggestions that the negative consequences of trans fat consumption go beyond the cardiovascular risk. In general, there is much less scientific consensus asserting that eating trans fat specifically increases the risk of other chronic health problems:
 Alzheimer's disease: A study published in Archives of Neurology in February 2003 suggested that the intake of both trans fats and saturated fats promotes the development of Alzheimer disease, although not confirmed in an animal model. It has been found that trans fats impaired memory and learning in middle-age rats. The brains of rats that ate trans-fats had fewer proteins critical to healthy neurological function. Inflammation in and around the hippocampus, the part of the brain responsible for learning and memory. These are the exact types of changes normally seen at the onset of Alzheimer's, but seen after six weeks, even though the rats were still young.
 Cancer: There is no scientific consensus that consuming trans fats significantly increases cancer risks across the board. The American Cancer Society states that a relationship between trans fats and cancer "has not been determined." One study has found a positive connection between trans fat and prostate cancer. However, a larger study found a correlation between trans fats and a significant decrease in high-grade prostate cancer. An increased intake of trans fatty acids may raise the risk of breast cancer by 75%, suggest the results from the French part of the European Prospective Investigation into Cancer and Nutrition.
 Diabetes: There is a growing concern that the risk of type 2 diabetes increases with trans fat consumption.  However, consensus has not been reached. For example, one study found that risk is higher for those in the highest quartile of trans fat consumption. Another study has found no diabetes risk once other factors such as total fat intake and BMI were accounted for.
 Obesity: Research indicates that trans fat may increase weight gain and abdominal fat, despite a similar caloric intake. A 6-year experiment revealed that monkeys fed a trans fat diet gained 7.2% of their body weight, as compared to 1.8% for monkeys on a mono-unsaturated fat diet. Although obesity is frequently linked to trans fat in the popular media, this is generally in the context of eating too many calories; there is not a strong scientific consensus connecting trans fat and obesity, although the 6-year experiment did find such a link, concluding that "under controlled feeding conditions, long-term TFA consumption was an independent factor in weight gain. TFAs enhanced intra-abdominal deposition of fat, even in the absence of caloric excess, and were associated with insulin resistance, with evidence that there is impaired post-insulin receptor binding signal transduction."
 Infertility in women: One 2007 study found, "Each 2% increase in the intake of energy from trans unsaturated fats, as opposed to that from carbohydrates, was associated with a 73% greater risk of ovulatory infertility...".
 Major depressive disorder: Spanish researchers analysed the diets of 12,059 people over six years and found that those who ate the most trans fats had a 48 per cent higher risk of depression than those who did not eat trans fats. One mechanism may be trans-fats' substitution for docosahexaenoic acid (DHA) levels in the orbitofrontal cortex (OFC). Very high intake of trans-fatty acids (43% of total fat) in mice from 2 to 16 months of age was associated with lowered DHA levels in the brain (p=0.001). When the brains of 15 major depressive subjects who had committed suicide were examined post-mortem and compared against 27 age-matched controls, the suicidal brains were found to have 16% less (male average) to 32% less (female average) DHA in the OFC. The OFC controls reward, reward expectation, and empathy (all of which are reduced in depressive mood disorders) and regulates the limbic system.
 Behavioral irritability and aggression: a 2012 observational analysis of subjects of an earlier study found a strong relation between dietary trans fat acids and self-reported behavioral aggression and irritability, suggesting but not establishing causality.
 Diminished memory: In a 2015 article, researchers re-analyzing results from the 1999-2005 UCSD Statin Study argue that "greater dietary trans fatty acid consumption is linked to worse word memory in adults during years of high productivity, adults age <45".
 Acne: According to a 2015 study, trans fats are one of several components of Western pattern diets which promote acne, along with carbohydrates with high glycemic load such as refined sugars or refined starches, milk and dairy products, and saturated fats, while omega-3 fatty acids, which reduce acne, are deficient in Western pattern diets.

Biochemical mechanisms

The exact biochemical process by which trans fats produce specific health problems are a topic of continuing research. Intake of dietary trans fat perturbs the body's ability to metabolize essential fatty acids (EFAs, including Omega-3) leading to changes in the phospholipid fatty acid composition of the arterial walls, thereby raising risk of coronary artery disease.

Trans double bonds are claimed to induce a linear conformation to the molecule, favoring its rigid packing as in plaque formation. The geometry of the cis double bond, in contrast, is claimed to create a bend in the molecule, thereby precluding rigid formations..

While the mechanisms through which trans fatty acids contribute to coronary artery disease are fairly well understood, the mechanism for their effects on diabetes is still under investigation. They may impair the metabolism of long-chain polyunsaturated fatty acids (LCPUFAs). However, maternal pregnancy trans fatty acid intake has been inversely associated with LCPUFAs levels in infants at birth thought to underlie the positive association between breastfeeding and intelligence.

Trans fats are processed by the liver differently than other fats.  They may cause liver dysfunction by interfering with delta 6 desaturase, an enzyme involved in converting essential fatty acids to arachidonic acid and prostaglandins, both of which are important to the functioning of cells.

Natural "trans fats" in dairy products

Some trans fatty acids occur in natural fats and traditionally processed foods. Vaccenic acid occurs in breast milk, and some isomers of conjugated linoleic acid (CLA) are found in meat and dairy products from ruminants. Butter, for example, contains about 3% trans fat.

The U.S. National Dairy Council has asserted that the trans fats present in animal foods are of a different type than those in partially hydrogenated oils, and do not appear to exhibit the same negative effects. A review agrees with the conclusion (stating that "the sum of the current evidence suggests that the Public health implications of consuming trans fats from ruminant products are relatively limited") but cautions that this may be due to the low consumption of trans fats from animal sources compared to artificial ones.

In a 2008 a meta-analysis found that all trans fats, regardless of natural or artificial origin equally raise LDL and lower HDL levels. Other studies though have shown different results when it comes to animal-based trans fats like conjugated linoleic acid (CLA). Although CLA is known for its anticancer properties, researchers have also found that the cis-9, trans-11 form of CLA can reduce the risk for cardiovascular disease and help fight inflammation.

Two Canadian studies have shown that vaccenic acid, a TFA that naturally occurs in dairy products, could be beneficial compared to hydrogenated vegetable shortening, or a mixture of pork lard and soy fat, by lowering total LDL and triglyceride levels. A study by the US Department of Agriculture showed that vaccenic acid raises both HDL and LDL cholesterol, whereas industrial trans fats only raise LDL with no beneficial effect on HDL.

Official recommendations

In light of recognized evidence and scientific agreement, nutritional authorities consider all trans fats equally harmful for health and recommend that their consumption be reduced to trace amounts. In 2003, the WHO recommended that trans fats make up no more than 0.9% of a person's diet and, in 2018, introduced a 6-step guide to eliminate industrially-produced trans-fatty acids from the global food supply.

The National Academy of Sciences (NAS) advises the U.S. and Canadian governments on nutritional science for use in public policy and product labeling programs. Their 2002 Dietary Reference Intakes for Energy, Carbohydrate, Fiber, Fat, Fatty Acids, Cholesterol, Protein, and Amino Acids contains their findings and recommendations regarding consumption of trans fat.

Their recommendations are based on two key facts. First, "trans fatty acids are not essential and provide no known benefit to human health", whether of animal or plant origin. Second, given their documented effects on the LDL/HDL ratio, the NAS concluded "that dietary trans fatty acids are more deleterious with respect to coronary artery disease than saturated fatty acids". A 2006 review published in the New England Journal of Medicine (NEJM)  that states "from a nutritional standpoint, the consumption of trans fatty acids results in considerable potential harm but no apparent benefit."

Because of these facts and concerns, the NAS has concluded there is no safe level of trans fat consumption. There is no adequate level, recommended daily amount or tolerable upper limit for trans fats. This is because any incremental increase in trans fat intake increases the risk of coronary artery disease.

Despite this concern, the NAS dietary recommendations have not included eliminating trans fat from the diet. This is because trans fat is naturally present in many animal foods in trace quantities, and thus its removal from ordinary diets might introduce undesirable side effects and nutritional imbalances. The NAS has, thus, "recommended that trans fatty acid consumption be as low as possible while consuming a nutritionally adequate diet". Like the NAS, the WHO has tried to balance public health goals with a practical level of trans fat consumption, recommending in 2003 that trans fats be limited to less than 1% of overall energy intake.

Regulatory action

In the last few decades, there has been substantial amount of regulation in many countries, limiting trans fat contents of industrialized and commercial food products.

Alternatives to hydrogenation
The negative public image and strict regulations has led to interest in replacing partial hydrogenation. In fat interesterification, the fatty acids are among a mix of triglycerides.  When applied to a suitable bend of oils and saturated fats, possibly followed by separation of unwanted solid or liquid triglycerides, this process could conceivably achieve results similar to those of partial hydrogenation without affecting the fatty acids themselves; in particular, without creating any new "trans fat".

Hydrogenation can be achieved with only small production of trans fat. The high-pressure methods produced margarine containing 5 to 6% trans fat. Based on current U.S. labeling requirements (see below), the manufacturer could claim the product was free of trans fat. The level of trans fat may also be altered by modification of the temperature and the length of time during hydrogenation.

One can mix oils (such as olive, soybean, and canola), water, monoglycerides, and fatty acids to form a "cooking fat" that acts the same way as trans and saturated fats.

Omega-three and omega-six fatty acids

The ω−3 fatty acids have received substantial attention. Among omega-3 fatty acids, neither long-chain nor short-chain forms were consistently associated with breast cancer risk. High levels of docosahexaenoic acid (DHA), however, the most abundant omega-3 polyunsaturated fatty acid in erythrocyte (red blood cell) membranes, were associated with a reduced risk of breast cancer. The DHA obtained through the consumption of polyunsaturated fatty acids is positively associated with cognitive and behavioral performance.  In addition, DHA is vital for the grey matter structure of the human brain, as well as retinal stimulation and neurotransmission.

Interesterification
Some studies have investigated the health effects of insteresterified (IE) fats, by comparing diets with IE and non-IE fats with the same overall fatty acid composition.

Several experimental studies in humans found no statistical difference on fasting blood lipids between a diet with large amounts of IE fat, having 25-40% C16:0 or C18:0 on the 2-position, and a similar diet with non-IE fat, having only 3-9% C16:0 or C18:0 on the 2-position. A negative result was obtained also in a study that compared the effects on blood cholesterol levels of an IE fat product mimicking cocoa butter and the real non-IE product.

A 2007 study funded by the Malaysian Palm Oil Board claimed that replacing natural palm oil by other interesterified or partially hydrogenated fats caused adverse health effects, such as higher LDL/HDL ratio and plasma glucose levels.  However, these effects could be attributed to the higher percentage of saturated acids in the IE and partially hydrogenated fats, rather than to the IE process itself.

Role in disease

In the human body, high levels of triglycerides in the bloodstream have been linked to atherosclerosis, heart disease
and stroke. However, the relative negative impact of raised levels of triglycerides compared to that of LDL:HDL ratios is as yet unknown. The risk can be partly accounted for by a strong inverse relationship between triglyceride level and HDL-cholesterol level. But the risk is also due to high triglyceride levels increasing the quantity of small, dense LDL particles.

Guidelines 

The National Cholesterol Education Program has set guidelines for triglyceride levels:

These levels are tested after fasting 8 to 12 hours. Triglyceride levels remain temporarily higher for a period after eating.

The AHA recommends an optimal triglyceride level of 100mg/dL (1.1mmol/L) or lower to improve heart health.

Reducing triglyceride levels 
Weight loss and dietary modification are effective first-line lifestyle modification treatments for hypertriglyceridemia. For people with mildly or moderately high levels of triglycerides, lifestyle changes, including weight loss, moderate exercise
and dietary modification, are recommended.
This may include restriction of carbohydrates (specifically fructose) and fat in the diet and the consumption of omega-3 fatty acids from algae, nuts, fish and seeds.
Medications are recommended in those with high levels of triglycerides that are not corrected with the aforementioned lifestyle modifications, with fibrates being recommended first.
Omega-3-carboxylic acids is another prescription drug used to treat very high levels of blood triglycerides.

The decision to treat hypertriglyceridemia with medication depends on the levels and on the presence of other risk factors for cardiovascular disease. Very high levels that would increase the risk of pancreatitis are treated with a drug from the fibrate class. Niacin and omega-3 fatty acids as well as drugs from the statin class may be used in conjunction, with statins being the main medication for moderate hypertriglyceridemia when reduction of cardiovascular risk is required.

Fat digestion and metabolism

Fats are broken down in the healthy body to release their constituents, glycerol and fatty acids.  Glycerol itself can be converted to glucose by the liver and so become a source of energy. Fats and other lipids are broken down in the body by enzymes called lipases produced in the pancreas.

Many cell types can use either glucose or fatty acids as a source of energy for metabolism. In particular, heart and skeletal muscle prefer fatty acids. Despite long-standing assertions to the contrary, fatty acids can also be used as a source of fuel for brain cells through mitochondrial oxidation.

See also
 Animal fat
 Diet and heart disease
 Fatty acid synthesis
 Food composition data
 Western pattern diet

References

Nutrients
Macromolecules